In United States public policy, supply-side progressivism is a political ideology that emphasizes increasing the supply of essential goods and services, such as housing, healthcare, and higher education, in order to make them more abundant and affordable. Supply-side progressives believe that some regulations artificially restrict the supply and drive up costs of essential goods and services, while other regulations, such as antitrust law, need to be implemented or enforced to encourage market competition and innovation. They also advocate for more investment in research and development for technologies such as sustainable energy sources in order to increase abundance and reduce costs over time.

History 
In the United States, supply-side economics has historically been coded as right-wing, and used to justify cutting taxes for the wealthy and reducing government regulations. Supply-side progressives aim to ensure that people across social classes have access to essential goods, by reducing regulations that restrict supply, and increasing regulations that improve supply and decrease cost. In the early 2010s, Miles Kimball termed "supply-side liberalism" with the launch of his blog, "Confessions of a Supply-Side Liberal". Over the next decade, he covered applications of supply-side liberalism on topics such as immigration and housing. In 2017, Neil Irwin of the New York Times wrote about increasing the US labor pool in his article "Supply-Side Economics, but for Liberals", including via the earned income tax credit and child-care subsidies.

During the COVID-19 pandemic, media attention for supply-side progressivism increased due to pandemic-related shortages. Matthew Yglesias wrote about supply-side interventions in decreasing cost and increasing access to healthcare. The Niskanen Center published a report about "cost-disease socialism", expanding on Baumol's cost disease, citing examples in healthcare, higher education, housing affordability, and childcare where supply-side solutions can be impactful. This was followed by a New York Times opinion piece by Ezra Klein advocating to Democrats to incorporate supply-side progressivism into their strategy, and a piece in The Atlantic by Derek Thompson about what he called "the abundance agenda", his "simple plan to solve all of America's problems". In 2021 Thompson started writing a column for The Atlantic about supply-side progressivism, called Work in Progress. In January 2022, a think tank that supports supply-side progressivism, the Institute for Progress, was launched, funded by Open Philanthropy and Tyler Cowen's Emergent Ventures.

Approach 

Conventional progressivism focuses on policies that redistribute wealth or subsidize access to basic goods, such as universal healthcare and housing vouchers. By contrast, supply-side progressivism aims to create more of these goods and services and make them more widely available. Another school of supply-side progressivism, anchored in the Rehn-Meidner model, emphasizes that innovation, productivity and structural change is enhanced by high minimum wages, solidaristic wage policies and low profit margins.

Reducing regulatory restriction of supply 
Supply-side progressives criticize regulations that constrain the supply of essential goods and services. Examples include zoning laws and building permit requirements that impede the building of new housing and infrastructure, as well as limits on doctor residency training positions and immigration.

Encouraging innovation 
Supply-side progressives emphasize innovation as a way to increase manufacturing capacity and throughput of existing goods, and to create new goods to help meet demand. This can come in the form of research, development, or implementation sponsored directly by the government, and prizes provided to people or companies who solve specific problems. Some supply-side progressives argue that increasing the supply of high-skilled immigrants will encourage innovation.

Applications

Housing 
Supply-side progressivism attributes the high cost of housing in many coastal cities to regulations such as zoning laws that prevent the construction of larger apartment buildings with more homes. Klein writes that, while progressives have long advocated for housing affordability, they have not until recently prioritized increasing housing production. In 2021, California banned single-family zoning. California also has a Housing Element Act that mandates that cities build housing for different income levels every year. Houston does not have land-use zoning, but they have a building code with height restrictions.

Healthcare 
In healthcare, the supply of doctors is restricted by limiting the number of doctor residency-training programs, increasing barriers for immigrant doctors to practice, and preventing nurses from providing certain medical services.  During the COVID-19 pandemic, the supply of vaccines and tests for COVID-19 have been restricted by the FDA, who were slow in approving development and manufacturing. Thompson advocates federal action to ramp up vaccine production capacity for new variants, "creating a super-team of virus hunters to monitor viral strains around the world", and "an Operation Warp Speed" for increasing vaccine manufacturing capacity globally. One group of researchers estimate that "installed capacity for 3 billion annual vaccine courses has a global benefit of $17.4 trillion, over $5800 per course."

Klein suggests allocating more government money for basic research and drug trials, as well as prize money for discovering treatments for specific conditions. Bernie Sanders has proposed legislation for such prizes. Yglesias said that government funding is also necessary to slow the decline in healthcare access in rural and low-income urban areas.

Lack of enforcement of antitrust regulations has been implicated in supply shortages of baby formula, kidney organ transplants, and drug shortages.

Energy 
Supply-side progressives push for energy abundance rather than energy conservation, noting that periods of accelerated human progress stem from energy abundance. They say this can be done through government investment in research and development and scale-up of new energy technology, especially in the clean energy sector. Beyond neutralizing climate change concerns with clean energy, Rachel Pritzker wrote in the Stanford Social Innovation Review that energy abundance could support energy-intensive environmental mitigation projects such as desalination plants for water treatment or plasma gasification for waste treatment.

Advocates say that government action to invest in clean energy without action to lift supply-side restrictions results in "cost-disease environmentalism". An example they give is that clean energy technology has been stymied by regulatory difficulties in acquiring building permits for solar or wind plants. A supporter of supply-side progressivism also points to nuclear power plants as an affected clean energy technology, with the US closing "more nuclear-power plants than we've opened this century", despite it being "99.6 percent greener... and 99.7 percent safer". Oil and gas drilling are exempt from most environmental reviews.

Transportation 
Similar concerns also affect the country's ability to build and maintain transportation infrastructure. Thompson said that, due to the National Environmental Policy Act, "endless and expensive impact analyses and environmental reviews have ground our infrastructure construction to a halt. From 1900 to 1904, New York City built and opened 28 subway stations. One hundred years later, the city needed about 17 years to build and open just three new stations along Second Avenue."

See also 
 List of countries by total health expenditure per capita
 YIMBY

References 

Progressivism in the United States
Supply-side economics